Live is a live concert album by American singer Erykah Badu, released in 1997. Released in the fall of 1997, with her debut album Baduizm released earlier that year, Live quickly went double platinum with the radio hit "Tyrone".

Live includes cover versions of songs by Rufus featuring Chaka Khan ("Stay"), Roy Ayers ("Searchin'") and a medley of Heatwave's "Boogie Nights", The Mary Jane Girls' "All Night Long", and "Funkin' for Jamaica (N.Y.)" by Tom Browne.

The album was nominated for Best R&B Album at the 1999 Grammy Awards, while the track "Tyrone" was nominated for Best Female R&B Vocal Performance.

Background
After she signed to Universal Records, Badu released her debut studio album Baduizm, in early 1997. The album was met with critical and commercial success, debuting at number two on the Billboard charts and number one on the US Billboard Top R&B/Hip-Hop Albums. Baduizms commercial and critical success helped establish Badu as one of the emerging neo soul genre's leading artists. Her particular style of singing drew many comparisons to Billie Holiday. 
Baduizm was certified three times platinum by the Recording Industry Association of America, Gold by the British Phonographic Industry and the Canadian Recording Industry Association.

Badu recorded the live album while pregnant with son Seven, and the release of the recording coincided with his birth.

Reception

Upon release Live was met with acclaim from music critics. 
Leo Stanley of Allmusic praised Badu's decision to release a live album so shortly after releasing her debut. "Not only does it illustrate the depths of Badu's talents, but Live is as strong and captivating as Baduizm, Stanley wrote. A reviewer of Entertainment Weekly praised the album's jazz influenced sounds, calling the album "sassy" and "relaxed".

The album was released on November 18, 1997, and reached number four on the US Billboard 200

and number one on the US Billboard Top R&B/Hip-Hop Albums. The album was certified two times platinum by RIAA for shipments of over two million copies.

Track listing
"Rimshot (Intro)" (Erykah Badu, Madukwu Chinwah, Miles Davis) – 3:48
"Otherside of the Game" (Badu, Bro.Questlove, Richard Nichols, James Poyser, The Roots) – 8:21
"On & On" (Badu, Jaborn Jamal) – 5:25
"Reprise" – 2:13
"Appletree" (Badu, Robert Bradford) – 2:54
"Ye Yo" (Badu) – 6:07
"Searching" (Roy Ayers) – 4:26
"Boogie Nights/All Night" (James A. Johnson, Rodney L. Temperton) – 6:03
"Certainly" (Badu, Chinwah) – 7:06
"Stay" (Rufus, Richard Calhoun, Chaka Khan) – 4:58
"Next Lifetime (Interlude)" (Badu, Tone The Backbone [Anthony Scott]) – 1:30
"Tyrone" (Badu, Norman "Keys" Hurt) – 3:56
"Next Lifetime" (Badu, Tone the Backbone [Anthony Scott]) – 12:05
"Tyrone" [Extended Version] (Badu, Hurt) – 5:40

Charts

Weekly charts

Year-end charts

Personnel
Erykah Badu – vocals
Charles "Poogie" Bell Jr. – drums
Karen Bernod – background vocals
Hubert Eaves IV – bass
Norman "Keys" Hurt – keyboard
N'dambi – background vocals
Joyce M. Strong – background vocals

Production
Producers: Erykah Badu, Norman "Keys" Hurt
Executive producers: Erykah Badu, Kedar Massenburg
Engineers: Erykah Badu, Norman "Keys" Hurt, Gorden Mack, Kenny Ortíz
Mixing: Erykah Badu, Norman "Keys" Hurt, Gorden Mack, Kenny Ortíz
Mastering: Tom Coyne
Art direction: D. Simmons, M. Warlow
Cover art concept: Erykah Badu, Clymenza Hawkins
Design: P. Geczik, Lance Ong
Layout design: P. Geczik
Photography: Imari Dusauzay, Imari Dusauzay
Artwork: P. Geczik, Lance Ong

See also
List of number-one R&B albums of 1997 (U.S.)

Certifications

References

Erykah Badu albums
1997 live albums
Live neo soul albums
Live contemporary R&B albums